Brian Sheen (born 30 December 1938) is an Australian former cricketer. He played five first-class matches for Tasmania between 1960 and 1964.

See also
 List of Tasmanian representative cricketers

References

External links
 

1938 births
Living people
Australian cricketers
Tasmania cricketers
Cricketers from Hobart